William E. Merritt (1910 or 1911 – May 14, 1988), nicknamed "Schute" or "Chute", was an American Negro league second baseman in the 1930s.

A native of Easton, Pennsylvania, Merritt graduated from Easton Area High School in 1930. He played for the Newark Dodgers in 1934, and served in the US Navy during World War II. Merritt died in his hometown of Easton in 1988 at age 77.

References

External links
 and Seamheads

1910s births
1988 deaths
Newark Dodgers players
Baseball second basemen
Baseball players from Pennsylvania
People from Easton, Pennsylvania
United States Navy personnel of World War II
20th-century African-American sportspeople